The Trinity Mountains are a subrange of the Klamath Mountains, one of the ranges within the California Coast Ranges and part the greater Pacific Coast Ranges, the coastal mountain system extending from Mexico to Alaska. The Trinity Mountains subrange rises in Siskiyou County and eastern  Trinity County, Northern California.

They are protected within the Shasta-Trinity National Forest.

Geography

Mount Eddy is the highest peak, at 9,037 ft (2,754 m), which is highest point of the northern segment of Pacific Coast Ranges within the lower forty-eight states.

Recreation
Places for outdoor recreation in the Trinity Mountains and their foothills include:
 Box Canyon Dam and Reservoir — trails + camping.
 Castle Crags State Park
 Castle Crags Wilderness Area
 Castle Lake
 Chapple-Shasta Off-Highway Vehicle Area.
 Clear Creek
 Whiskeytown-Shasta-Trinity National Recreation Area
 Lewiston Lake reservoir area, in the Trinity Unit. 
 Shasta Lake reservoir area, in the Shasta Unit. 
 Trinity Lake reservoir area, in the Trinity Unit. 
 Whiskeytown Lake reservoir area, in the Whiskeytown Unit.

Natural history
The Trinity Mountains contain significant forested areas, including stands of Black Oak (Quercus kelloggii), Blue Oak (Quercus douglasii) and Douglas-fir (Pseudotsuga menziesii). The Quercus douglasii occurrences are a disjunctive population of this California endemic tree species.

See also

References

External links

 
Mountain ranges of Siskiyou County, California
Mountain ranges of Trinity County, California
Klamath Mountains
Shasta-Trinity National Forest
California Coast Ranges
Mountain ranges of Northern California